Alec Díaz (born December 7, 2001) is a footballer who plays as a forward for Toronto FC II in MLS Next Pro. Born in the mainland United States, he represents the Puerto Rico national team.

Early life
Díaz was born in San Juan, Puerto Rico and began playing soccer at age three or four. He played youth soccer with Pacific Northwest SC(PacNW). He also played at the state level for Washington.

In 2015, he joined the Seattle Sounders FC Academy via the Sounders Discovery Program. At the U16 level, he helped them win the Youdan Trophy in 2016 defeating FC Basel. In 2018, he won the USSDA National Championship with the U17 Sounders, scoring 36 goals in 38 matches across all competitions and also scored the winning goal to win the Generation Adidas Cup over the New York Red Bulls Academy.

Club career
In 2018, he signed a USL Academy contract with Seattle Sounders FC 2 (later renamed to Tacoma Defiance). He made his USL debut on September 5, 2018, appearing as a 59th-minute substitute in a 4–4 draw against the Tulsa Roughnecks. He scored his first professional goal on October 10 against the Colorado Springs Switchbacks.

Díaz signed a professional contract with Seattle Sounders FC 2 ahead of their 2019 season. In his first full professional season, he scored one goal in 16 appearances. In 2020, he ranked in the top 10 in the league in combined goals and assists per 90 minutes, the only teenager in the top 10.

In March 2022, he joined Toronto FC II of MLS Next Pro.

International career
In January 2019, Díaz was called up to a training camp for the United States U18.

In September 2019, Díaz was called up to the Puerto Rico national team ahead of a friendly match against Honduras and CONCACAF Nations League match against Guatemala. He made his debut against Honduras on September 5, 2019.

In February 2020, he was called up for the Puerto Rico U-20 national team for the first round of the 2020 CONCACAF U-20 Championship qualifying tournament. He appeared in all three matches, including scoring two goals against the Cayman Islands U20.

Notes

References

External links
 

2001 births
Living people
Puerto Rican footballers
Puerto Rico international footballers
American soccer players
Association football forwards
People from Issaquah, Washington
Tacoma Defiance players
Soccer players from Washington (state)
Sportspeople from King County, Washington
USL Championship players
Puerto Rico youth international footballers
Toronto FC II players
MLS Next Pro players